László Habis (born 20 June 1952) is a Hungarian politician, who served as the mayor of Eger from 2006 to 2019. He was a member of the National Assembly (MP) for Eger (Heves County Constituency I) from 2010 to 2014.

References

1952 births
Living people
Hungarian economists
Mayors of places in Hungary
Fidesz politicians
Christian Democratic People's Party (Hungary) politicians
Members of the National Assembly of Hungary (2010–2014)
People from Eger